Hemp has been grown continuously in France for hundreds of years or longer for use as a textile, paper, animal bedding, and for nautical applications.

History

There is archaeological evidence that Neolithic Europeans used hemp cloth in what is now Southern France 4,000 years BP. Hemp was introduced as a crop from Central and East Asia to Europe by the Scythians during the Bronze Age, and it was cultivated in France by 1000 CE and used for a number of purposes including canvas for sails and sacks, rope, and as a textile.
William Shakespeare wrote of the quality of hemp cloth from Locronan in the tragedy Coriolanus. The Corderie Royale was built at Arsenal de Rochefort in 1666 for hemp rope needed by the Royal (French) Navy's rigging. In the 19th century, hemp production reached . Breton hemp (from Brittany) was considered some of the finest in the world. 
The French Navy "always" used national hemp sources for oakum necessary to seal wooden boats and ships.

Decline
Production declined and nearly went extinct with the introduction of other fibers, especially cotton, until its reintroduction in the 1960s. France is the only Western European country that never prohibited hemp cultivation in the 20th century.

Modern hemp
France produced more than half of the hemp in Europe most years between 1993 and 2015. Most modern hemp seed cultivars originate from France and a handful of other European countries, or China. Hemp fiber from France is used to make hemp paper and the hurds are used to make bedding for horses and other domesticated animals. As of 1994, most of the crop was used to make high quality paper for Bibles, currency and rolling paper.

Coopérative Centrale Des Producteurs De Semences De Chanvre is the main supplier of hempseed in the European Union.

See also
Cannabis in France

Notes

References

Sources
 

 

 

 
 

Agriculture in France
France